Santa Crucino or Santacrucino may refer to:
 Santa Crucino people, an ethnic group of Peru
 Santa Crucino language, a language of Peru

See also 
 Santacrucian, a period in geologic time
 Santa Cruz (disambiguation)

Language and nationality disambiguation pages